Gangga may refer to:

 Gangga, Shannan, Tibet
Gangga, Lhasa, Tibet (29°37'5"N   91°14'47)